Island Bay is a coastal suburb of Wellington, the capital of New Zealand, situated  south of the city centre.

Island Bay lies on the bay which shares its name, one of numerous small bays off Cook Strait and west of Lyall Bay. 500m offshore in Island Bay lies Tapu Te Ranga Island, which forms a natural breakwater and provides a sheltered anchorage for local fishing boats.

Noted current Island Bay residents include Minister of Justice Andrew Little MP, and Celia Wade-Brown, former Mayor of Wellington. Former residents include Bruce Stewart, writer and dramatist at Tapu Te Ranga Marae; Middlesbrough F.C. and All Whites striker Chris Killen; artist John Drawbridge; poet Alan Brunton; writer Robin Hyde; and, in the late 19th century, The Hermit of Island Bay.

History
Tapu te Ranga Island is said to be Patawa, a point from which the legendary Māori chief Kupe sighted the giant octopus Te Wheke-a-Muturangi, which he pursued across Cook Strait. In pre-European times, Island Bay was home to several pa, including Te Mupunga Kainga, today represented with a pou in Shorland Park. A succession of iwi occupied Island Bay, including Ngai Tara, Ngati Ira.

A famous battle which took place on the beach of Island Bay has been well documented by Elsdon Best. A raiding taua (war party) from Muau-poko were making their way to the Ngai Tara stronghold of Te Whetu-Kairangi, a fortified pa on what is now Miramar peninsular (but was then an island). In the morning, Ngai Tara warriors came down from Uruhau fort (modern day Southgate) and engaged Muau-poko in battle on the beach. Two muaupoko chiefs were killed, and later cremated in Haewai (Houghton Bay). This battle is commemorated with a pou on the zig-zag leading from Liffey street to Orchy crescent.

During a battle in which Ngati Mutunga drove Ngati Ira from Wellington in 1827, Tamairangi, the wife of the Ngati Ira chief, is said to have sought refuge on Tapu te Ranga Island with her children, fleeing by canoe when Tapu te Ranga Island was besieged. In Treaty of Waitangi settlements, both Te Atiawa and Ngati Toa have claimed tangata whenua status over Tapu te Ranga Island. Ngati Toas case was proven in the Māori Land Court

In the early days of European settlement George Hunter was the chief proprietor of the Island Bay Estate, where he bred stock on his stud farm. The Island Bay portion was subdivided and auctioned in March 1879. In the late 19th century, Island Bay was settled by Italian and Shetlander fishermen. In 1905, Wellington's tramline was extended to Island Bay, increasing the area's popularity, and steadily transforming it into a seaside suburb. Many Island Bay villas, bungalows and shops date from the 1920s, a period of rapid development for the area. This included the subdivision of the Island Bay Racecourse which was once bounded by Clyde Street on the East and Ribble Street on the West. Many streets in Island Bay were named after British and European rivers.

Notable features

Erskine College and Chapel 
Designed by John Sydney Swan and built in 1904–1906, The Convent of the Sacred Heart, a Catholic girls' boarding school, was renamed Erskine College in the late 1960s after the former Superior General Mother Janet Erskine Stuart. The adjacent Erskine Chapel of the Sacred Heart, also designed by John Sydney Swan, was built in 1930 in the French Gothic style. Erskine Chapel is considered to have one of the finest chapel interiors in New Zealand, and is listed as Category I in New Zealand's Historic Places Trust. The school closed in 1985 and today the complex is privately owned. Erskine College was used as a location in Peter Jackson's 1996 film The Frighteners. The chapel was refurbished in 2003, and is now a popular venue for weddings and concerts.

Island Bay Marine Education Centre
The Island Bay Marine Education Centre on the foreshore has a small aquarium and touch tank, and is open to the public on alternate Sundays.

Churches
There are five churches in Island Bay. The oldest is the Anglican church, which is over 100 years old. It has a traditional brick front design, and some stained glass windows honouring the early settlers. It is named after St Hilda of Whitby, as the early settlers felt the coastline resembled Northumbria. The Baptist, Catholic, Serbian Orthodox and Presbyterian churches are younger. The churches have facilities that are used for a range of community groups. Church activities include a full range of programmes for all ages, including the annual Teddy Bears' Picnic for children which forms part of the Island Bay festival.

Scuba diving and snorkeling
Two diving companies operate in Island Bay, and offer trips within the local Taputeranga Marine Reserve and to the wreck of HMNZS Wellington, a decommissioned Royal New Zealand Navy frigate which was sunk off the coast of Island Bay in November 2005 to create an artificial reef.

A snorkel trail is located on the eastern side of the bay and offers opportunities to see local fish and marine life.

Shorland Park
Shorland Park is a small public park at Island Bay Beach. The playground includes a mock wooden ship and is a favourite for children's birthday parties.

Shorland Park contains a Band Rotunda near the waterfront (built in 1930). Plaques record the 152 local soldiers who died in World War I and World War II, and the loss of American submarines and their crew in the Pacific. In the 1930s, local brass bands and the Salvation Army frequently played in the rotunda. The rotunda is now used for occasional concerts, notably during the annual Island Bay Festival.

Tapu Te Ranga Marae
The  wooden house extended over ten levels, and was built with recycled materials.

The marae was built by Stewart over a few years between 1977 to 1983.

At 12:30am on 9 June 2019, the marae suffered a devastating fire and was subsequently destroyed.

Taputeranga Marine Reserve
The waters surrounding Island Bay are under the protection of the Department of Conservation since the creation of the 854 hectare Taputeranga Marine Reserve in 2006. The reserve is home to kelp forests, octopuses, blue cod and banded wrasse. Dolphins and whales also frequent the area. A 200m 'snorkel trail' within the reserve starts and finishes in Island Bay.

Tapu Te Ranga Motu (the Island)
Tapu Te Ranga Motu, the island in the middle of the bay, once served as a refuge of local Māori. Tamairanga, the wife of the Ngati Ira chief Whanake, escaped to the island with her children during a battle that forced the tribe from Wellington Harbour.

Victoria University Coastal Ecology Laboratory
Victoria University of Wellington  maintains the Victoria University Coastal Ecology Laboratory, an active research and teaching presence on Wellington's south coast at the Victoria University Coastal Ecology Laboratory, which overlooks the spectacular exposed rocky reef systems typical of Cook Strait.

Walkways
Island Bay is the starting point for two recreational walkways that cross the city. The City to Sea Walkway runs  between Parliament and Island Bay through the Botanic Gardens and Aro Valley. The  Southern Walkway follows the Town Belt between Island Bay and Oriental Bay.

Island Bay Festival

The annual Island Bay Festival takes place over eight days each February. It include:

 The Blessing of the Boats. The Blessing of the Boats is a southern Italian tradition where boats are decorated with flags and blessed by a priest to protect the crew from the sea and to bring good fortune. The ceremony has been adopted in Island Bay since 1933, when the fishing boat Santina foundered in Cook Strait, with the loss of four crew including three Italians. A chair was unveiled on 13 February 2011, during the Island Bay Festival for the crew of the Santina, presented by friends and family of the four casualties.
 The Ribble Street Races: A Soapbox derby down the steep Ribble Street attracts budding racecar drivers with Junior, Intermediate, Senior and Expert categories, the latter often reaching 65 km/h.
 The Island Bay Raft Race: The inaugural raft race was in 2020, with DIY rafts and family teams paddling parallel to the beach, the Lyall Bay Surf club provided support and rescue services on the day.
 The swim to/from the Island: Participants are ferried by boat to the Island, and swim the few hundred metres back to shore, a 'there and back' race is held also.
 The Festival Parade: Proceeding down The Parade to Shorland Park, the Festival Parade features a colourful 'dressing of the bicycles' competition.
 The Teddy Bears Picnic: On the final Sunday of the festival the younger members of the community bring their Teddy Bears for a special picnic in Shorland Park.

Demographics

Island Bay had a population of 6,897 at the 2018 New Zealand census, an increase of 291 people (4.4%) since the 2013 census, and an increase of 495 people (7.7%) since the 2006 census. There were 2,424 households. There were 3,351 males and 3,546 females, giving a sex ratio of 0.95 males per female, with 1,413 people (20.5%) aged under 15 years, 1,311 (19.0%) aged 15 to 29, 3,447 (50.0%) aged 30 to 64, and 729 (10.6%) aged 65 or older.

Ethnicities were 84.5% European/Pākehā, 9.2% Māori, 5.7% Pacific peoples, 9.6% Asian, and 3.5% other ethnicities (totals add to more than 100% since people could identify with multiple ethnicities).

The proportion of people born overseas was 26.9%, compared with 27.1% nationally.

Although some people objected to giving their religion, 55.6% had no religion, 32.4% were Christian, 2.3% were Hindu, 0.5% were Muslim, 0.9% were Buddhist and 2.9% had other religions.

Of those at least 15 years old, 2,487 (45.4%) people had a bachelor or higher degree, and 480 (8.8%) people had no formal qualifications. The employment status of those at least 15 was that 3,246 (59.2%) people were employed full-time, 834 (15.2%) were part-time, and 186 (3.4%) were unemployed.

Arts and culture
 Rita Angus, artist
 While living in Wellington in the 1960s, Rita Angus painted a number of scenes in Island Bay. Boats, Island Bay is one of her best-loved paintings.

 Empire Cinema, film
 The art deco Empire Theatre screened films between 1925 and 1964. It reopened as the Empire Cinema in 2005.
 Laura Garland, artist
 Laura Garland lives in Island Bay, and paints colourful Wellington and New Zealand scenes.

 Michael McCormack, artist
 Michael McCormack is an Irish-born painter who works from his studio and gallery in Island Bay, painting vivid streetscapes and coastal scenes around Wellington.

 Music
 Rock frontmen Andrew Fagan of the Mockers and Jon Toogood of Shihad grew up in Island Bay. Samuel Flynn Scott, Conrad Wedde of New Zealand group The Phoenix Foundation also live in the suburb.

 Literature
 Children's authors Fleur Beale, Suzanne Main and Brigid Feehan all live in Island Bay.

 Red Mole, theatre
 Alan Brunton and Sally Rodwell of the Red Mole experimental theatre group, were based in Island Bay from 1988 until Brunton's death in 2002.

Chris Visser-Fee, comedian, was raised, and continues to live in Island Bay, where he regularly performs comedic routines, many known for their slapstick appeal.
 Freya Elkink, artist, resides in Island Bay. Her art form mostly composes of artistic impressionism, placing popular Wellington faces into less than likely situations.

Education

Gallery

References

External links

Suburbs of Wellington City
Cook Strait
Bays of the Wellington Region